{{DISPLAYTITLE:C4H7BrO2}}
The molecular formula C4H7BrO2 (molar mass: 167.002 g/mol, exact mass: 165.9629 u) may refer to:

 2-Bromobutyric acid
 Ethyl bromoacetate

Molecular formulas